Kvalsund ( and ) is a former municipality in the old Finnmark county in Norway. The municipality is now part of Hammerfest Municipality in Troms og Finnmark county.  The municipality existed from 1869 until its dissolution in 2020. The administrative centre of the municipality was the village of Kvalsund. Other villages in the municipality include Áisaroaivi, Kokelv, Oldernes, Oldervik, Revsneshamn, Skaidi.

At the time of its dissolution on 1 January 2020, the  municipality was the 37th largest by area out of the 422 municipalities in Norway. Kvalsund was also the 392nd most populous municipality in Norway with a population of 1,027.

The Kvalsund Bridge is a suspension bridge that crosses the Kvalsundet strait from the mainland to the island of Kvaløya.

In 2015, the media said that for four years an application has been filed for establishing Norway's largest copper mine, depending on a permit for creating a zone in Repparfjorden for depositing waste from the mine.<ref>{{Cite news |last=Ytreberg |first=Rune |date=2015-09-12 |title=Dette er ikke en lek |page=16 |publisher=Dagens Næringsliv}}</ref>

General information
The municipality of Kvalsund was established on 1 July 1869 when it was separated from the Hammerfest landdistrikt (the rural municipality surrounding the town of Hammerfest). Initially, Kvalsund had 514 residents. On 1 January 1963, the Kokelv area in southern Måsøy Municipality (population: 34) was transferred to Kvalsund.

On 1 January 2020, Kvalsund municipality was merged into the neighboring municipality of Hammerfest, a decision that the people of the two municipalities had agreed to in 2017.

Name
The Old Norse form of the name was Hvalsund. The first element is hvalr which means "whale" and the last element is sund which means "strait" or "sound". The Sámi name also translates to Whale (fáles) Strait (nuorri).

Coat of arms
The coat of arms was granted on 27 March 1987. The official blazon is "Azure, three salmon argent in pall heads to center". This means the arms have a blue field (background) and the charge is three salmon arranged in pall with their heads facing the centre. The salmon have a tincture of argent which means they are commonly colored white, but if it is made out of metal, then silver is used. The blue color in the field and the salmon were chosen to represent fishing in various forms: as a traditional way of living and source of income, as modern fish farming, and as a recreational activity in the area. The arms were designed by Ingunn Bjerkås. 

Churches
The Church of Norway had two parishes within the municipality of Kvalsund. It is part of the Hammerfest prosti (deanery) in the Diocese of Nord-Hålogaland.

Culture

Aboriginal culture
Until a few hundred years ago, the Coast Sámi culture was completely dominant in Kvalsund. Norwegian and Kven immigration soon made the area multicultural. During Norwegianization much of the traditional culture was lost. Kokelv is the village that has most successfully preserved elements of Sámi culture, and today has a Coast Sámi museum. The gakti of the Kvalsund region is easily recognizable by dots and jags on the collars (for men) and sleeves (for women).

Fægstock
The municipality hosts an annual rock festival known as Fægstock, which takes place in Fægfjord (meaning "twilight fiord").

Government
The municipal council  of Kvalsund was made up of 15 representatives that were elected to four year terms. The party breakdown of the final municipal council was as follows:

Geography

The municipality is mostly located on the mainland, but parts of the municipality are also located on the islands of Kvaløya and Seiland.  The Seilandsjøkelen glacier is partially located in Kvalsund.  Lakes in the municipality include Bjørnstadvatnet and Doggejávri.

Settlements
Historically, that village was called Finnbyen'', a name meaning simply "Coast Sámi settlement". Most villages in the municipality have two names: one in Norwegian and one in Sami. Other villages in the municipality include Skáidi ("meeting-place of rivers" in Sámi); Stállugárgu or Stallogargo ("troll beach"); Neverfjord or Návvuotna; and Kokelv/Guoikejohka. Regarding the latter toponyms, the Neverfjord translates to "tinder fjord" and Návvuotna to "cowshed fjord"; while Kokelv is "boiling river" in Norwegian and Guiokejohka means "rushing river" in Sámi.

Birdlife
The municipality of Kvalsund has several localities that have a rich and varied bird fauna. One of these is Repparfjordbotn with its large colony of Arctic terns and its autumn numbers of goosander.

Climate

See also
List of former municipalities of Norway

References

External links

 
Hammerfest
Former municipalities of Norway
1869 establishments in Norway
2020 disestablishments in Norway
Populated places disestablished in 2020